Naina Devi (27 September 1917 – 1 November 1993) also known as Naina Ripjit Singh, was Indian vocalist of Hindustani classical music, most known for her thumri renditions, though she also sang dadra and ghazals. She was a music producer at All India Radio and later with Doordarshan. She started her musical training under Girja Shankar Chakravarty in her teens, later restarted it with Ustad Mushtaq Hussain Khan of Rampur-Sahaswan gharana and Rasoolan Bai of Benaras gharana, in the 1950s. Born in an aristocratic family in Kolkata, she was married into the royal family of Kapurthala State at age 16, and was started singing in concerts only after her husband died in 1949, and she moved to Delhi.

In 1974, she was awarded the Padma Shri, the fourth highest civilian honour given by Government of India.

Early life and training
Born Nilina Sen, in an aristocratic Bengali family in Kolkata, where her grandfather was Keshub Chandra Sen, nationalist leader and social reformer from the Brahmo Samaj movement. One of five siblings: (Sunit, Binita, Sadhona, Nilina and Pradip), Nilina received a  liberal upbringing from their parents Saral Chandra Sen, a barrister and Nirmala (Nellie). She first got interested in music, when her uncle, Panchu took young Nilina to a concert of Angurbala, at a local theatre. Thereafter, she went to listen to Agurbala at her home in Masjid Bari Street. Eventually she trained for nine years under Girija Shankar Chakravarty (1885–1948), noted vocalist and teacher, known for revitalising the khayal tradition in Bengal.

In 1934, at the age of 16, she married Ripjit Singh (1906- 1953), third son of Raja Charanjit Singh of princely Kapurthala State. After her marriage she moved to Kapurthala in Punjab and wasn't allowed to sing. Though her husband died in 1953, when she was 32 years of age.

Career
After the death of husband in 1953, she moved to Delhi, where she spent the rest of her life. Here she came in touch with Sumitra Charat Ram, an arts patron and wife of Lala Charat Ram of DCM Shriram Group, who then ran Jhankar Committee, a small performing arts organisation in Delhi, which paved way for the establishment of Shriram Bharatiya Kala Kendra in 1952, with Devi as its artistic director. In the following years, she also remained a music producer of All India Radio, Delhi, and producer with state-run Doordarshan TV channel. Meanwhile, after arriving in Delhi, she started her musical training once again, first under Ustad Mushtaq Hussain Khan (d. 1964), the doyen of Rampur-Sahaswan gharana, who was then teacher at the Bhartiya Kala Kendra, and later under Rasoolan Bai of Benaras gharana, where she learned the purab ang style of Thumri, and started performing although under the name, Naina Devi.

In her Thumri singing, she stressed on the need to study Nayika Bheda (Ashta Nayika), the eight different kind of heroines classified in the Natya Shastra, to render thumri effectively. Though she also sang in other genres like qawwali and ghazal.

Later in life, she got interested in the traditional form of kirtan, she went to Vrindavan and learnt it and subsequently trained three of her senior disciples in the form.

She also taught notable disciples like Shubha Mudgal, Madhumita Ray and Vidya Rao. In 2011, one of her disciples, Vidya Rao wrote a memoir about her titled, Heart to Heart: Remembering Naina Devi.

Personal life
She has four children, two sons, Ratanjit Singh (b.1940), Karanjit Singh (b. 1945), and two daughters Nilika Kaur (b. 1935) and Rena Kaur (b. 1938), who founded the Naina Devi Foundation in 1994. Her elder sister, Sadhana Bose (1911–1973) was a noted dancer and film actress of the 1930s and 40s. Her other sister Rani Binita Roy was married into the 
royal family of Chakma. Naina Devi's two paternal aunts were dowager Maharanis of two well known princely states of India. Suniti Devi, Maharani of Cooch Behar, queen consort of Nripendra Narayan Bhup Bahadur, Maharaja of Cooch Behar. Maharani Suniti Devi's son Jitendra Narayan Bhup Bahadur, Maharaja of Cooch Behar married princess Indira Raje Gaekwad of Braoda, only daughter of Sayajirao Gaekwad, Maharaja of Baroda. Jitendra Narayan and Indira Devi's second daughter Gayatri Devi, Maharani of Jaipur was the most well known Indian royal face in her lifetime. The other aunt of Naina Devi was Suchrau Devi, Maharani of Mayurbhanj, queen consort of Ram Chandra Bhanj Deo, Maharaja of Mayurbhanj.

Published works
 Mushtaq Hussain Khan (Biography), by Naina Ripjit Singh. Sangeet Natak Akademi, 1964.
 Thumri, Its Development and Gayeki, Journal, Volume 6, Issue 1. ITC Sangeet Research Academy.1985. pp. 13–17.

References

Bibliography
 
 
 

1917 births
1993 deaths
Singers from Kolkata
Bengali Hindus
Indian women classical singers
Hindustani singers
Indian arts administrators
Thumri
Indian radio producers
Indian women television producers
Indian television producers
All India Radio people
Recipients of the Padma Shri in arts
Indian music educators
Indian artistic directors
20th-century Indian singers
Women educators from West Bengal
20th-century Indian educators
Women Hindustani musicians
20th-century Indian women singers
Women musicians from West Bengal
Educators from West Bengal
All India Radio women
Women music educators
Women television producers
20th-century women educators
Women radio producers